George Gordon Byron, 6th Baron Byron  (22 January 1788 – 19 April 1824), known simply as Lord Byron, was an English romantic poet and peer. He was one of the leading figures of the Romantic movement, and has been regarded as among the greatest of English poets. Among his best-known works are the lengthy narratives Don Juan and Childe Harold's Pilgrimage; many of his shorter lyrics in Hebrew Melodies also became popular.

Byron was educated at Trinity College, Cambridge, later travelling extensively across Europe to places such as Italy, where he lived for seven years in Venice, Ravenna, and Pisa after he was forced to flee England due to lynching threats. During his stay in Italy, he frequently visited his friend and fellow poet Percy Bysshe Shelley. Later in life Byron joined the Greek War of Independence fighting the Ottoman Empire and died leading a campaign during that war, for which Greeks revere him as a folk hero. He died in 1824 at the age of 36 from a fever contracted after the First and Second Sieges of Missolonghi.

His only legitimate child, Ada Lovelace, was a founding figure in the field of computer programming based on her notes for Charles Babbage's Analytical Engine. Byron's extramarital children include Allegra Byron, who died in childhood, and possibly Elizabeth Medora Leigh, daughter of his half-sister Augusta Leigh.



Family and early life

George Gordon Byron was born on 22 January 1788, on Holles Street in London, England – his birthplace is now supposedly occupied by a branch of the department store John Lewis.

Byron was the only child of Captain John Byron (known as 'Jack') and his second wife Catherine Gordon, heiress of the Gight estate in Aberdeenshire, Scotland. Byron's paternal grandparents were Vice-Admiral John Byron and Sophia Trevanion. Having survived a shipwreck as a teenage midshipman, Vice Admiral John Byron set a new speed record for circumnavigating the globe. After he became embroiled in a tempestuous voyage during the American Revolutionary War, John was nicknamed 'Foul-Weather Jack' Byron by the press.

Byron's father had previously been somewhat scandalously married to Amelia, Marchioness of Carmarthen, with whom he had been having an affair – the wedding took place just weeks after her divorce from her husband, and she was around eight months pregnant. The marriage was not a happy one, and their first two children – Sophia Georgina, and an unnamed boy – died in infancy. Amelia herself died in 1784 almost exactly a year after the birth of their third child, the poet's half-sister Augusta Mary. Though Amelia died from a wasting illness, probably tuberculosis, the press reported that her heart had been broken out of remorse for leaving her husband. Much later, 19th-century sources blamed Jack's own "brutal and vicious" treatment of her.

Jack then married Catherine Gordon of Gight on 13 May 1785, by all accounts only for her fortune. To claim his second wife's estate in Scotland, Byron's father took the additional surname "Gordon", becoming "John Byron Gordon", and occasionally styled himself "John Byron Gordon of Gight". Byron's mother had to sell her land and title to pay her new husband's debts, and in the space of two years, the large estate, worth some £23,500, had been squandered, leaving the former heiress with an annual income in trust of only £150. In a move to avoid his creditors, Catherine accompanied her profligate husband to France in 1786, but returned to England at the end of 1787 to give birth to her son.

The boy was born on 22 January in lodgings at Holles Street in London, and christened at St Marylebone Parish Church as "George Gordon Byron". His father appears to have wished to call his son 'William', but as her husband remained absent, the young Byron's mother named him after her own father George Gordon of Gight, who was a descendant of James I of Scotland, and who had died by suicide some four years earlier, in 1779.

Catherine moved back to Aberdeenshire in 1790, and Byron spent part of his childhood there. His father soon joined them in their lodgings in Queen Street, but the couple quickly separated. Catherine regularly experienced mood swings and bouts of melancholy, which could be partly explained by her husband's continuingly borrowing money from her. As a result, she fell even further into debt to support his demands. One of these loans enabled him to travel to Valenciennes, France, where he died of a "long & suffering illness" – probably tuberculosis – in 1791.

When Byron's great-uncle, who was posthumously labelled the "wicked" Lord Byron, died on 21 May 1798, the 10-year-old boy became the sixth Baron Byron of Rochdale and inherited the ancestral home, Newstead Abbey, in Nottinghamshire. His mother proudly took him to England, but the Abbey was in an embarrassing state of disrepair and, rather than live there, she decided to lease it to Lord Grey de Ruthyn, among others, during Byron's adolescence.

Described as "a woman without judgment or self-command", Catherine either spoiled and indulged her son or vexed him with her capricious stubbornness. Her drinking disgusted him and he often mocked her for being short and corpulent, which made it difficult for her to catch him to discipline him. Byron had been born with a deformed right foot; his mother once retaliated and, in a fit of temper, referred to him as "a lame brat". However, Byron's biographer, Doris Langley Moore, in her 1974 book Accounts Rendered, paints a more sympathetic view of Mrs Byron, showing how she was a staunch supporter of her son and sacrificed her own precarious finances to keep him in luxury at Harrow and Cambridge. Langley-Moore questions 19th-century biographer John Galt's claim that she over-indulged in alcohol.

Byron's mother-in-law Judith Noel, the Hon. Lady Milbanke, died in 1822, and her will required that he change his surname to "Noel" in order to inherit half of her estate. He accordingly obtained a Royal Warrant, enabling him to "take and use the surname of Noel only" and to "subscribe the said surname of Noel before all titles of honour". From that point, he signed himself "Noel Byron" (the usual signature of a peer being merely the name of the peerage, in this case simply "Byron"). Some have speculated that he did this so that his initials would read "N.B.", mimicking those of his hero, Napoleon Bonaparte. Lady Byron eventually succeeded to the Barony of Wentworth, becoming "Lady Wentworth".

Education
Byron received his early formal education at Aberdeen Grammar School in 1798 until his move back to England as a 10-year-old. In August 1799 he entered the school of Dr. William Glennie, in Dulwich. Placed under the care of a Dr. Bailey, he was encouraged to exercise in moderation but could not restrain himself from "violent" bouts of activity in an attempt to compensate for his deformed foot. His mother interfered with his studies, often withdrawing him from school, which arguably contributed to his lack of self-discipline and his neglect of his classical studies.

In 1801, he was sent to Harrow School, where he remained until July 1805. An undistinguished student and an unskilled cricketer, he nevertheless represented the school during the very first Eton v Harrow cricket match at Lord's in 1805.

His lack of moderation was not restricted to physical exercise. Byron fell in love with Mary Chaworth, whom he met while at school, and she was the reason he refused to return to Harrow in September 1803. His mother wrote, "He has no indisposition that I know of but love, desperate love, the worst of all maladies in my opinion. In short, the boy is distractedly in love with Miss Chaworth." In Byron's later memoirs, "Mary Chaworth is portrayed as the first object of his adult sexual feelings."

The most enduring of those was with John FitzGibbon, 2nd Earl of Clare—four years Byron's junior—whom he was to meet again unexpectedly many years later, in 1821, in Italy. His nostalgic poems about his Harrow friendships, Childish Recollections (1806), express a prescient "consciousness of sexual differences that may in the end make England untenable to him." Letters to Byron in the John Murray archive contain evidence of a previously unremarked if short-lived romantic relationship with a younger boy at Harrow, John Thomas Claridge.

The following autumn, he entered Trinity College, Cambridge, where he met and formed a close friendship with the younger John Edleston. About his "protégé" he wrote, "He has been my almost constant associate since October, 1805, when I entered Trinity College. His voice first attracted my attention, his countenance fixed it, and his manners attached me to him for ever." After Edleston’s death, Byron composed Thyrza, a series of elegies, in his memory. In later years, he described the affair as "a violent, though  love and passion". This statement, however, needs to be read in the context of hardening public attitudes toward homosexuality in England and the severe sanctions (including public hanging) imposed upon convicted or even suspected offenders. The liaison, on the other hand, may well have been "pure" out of respect for Edleston's innocence, in contrast to the (probably) more sexually overt relations experienced at Harrow School. The poem "The Cornelian" was written about the cornelian that Byron had received from Edleston.

Byron spent three years at Trinity College, engaging in sexual escapades, boxing, horse riding, and gambling. While at Cambridge, he also formed lifelong friendships with men such as John Cam Hobhouse, who initiated him into the Cambridge Whig Club, which endorsed liberal politics, and Francis Hodgson, a Fellow at King's College, with whom he corresponded on literary and other matters until the end of his life.

Career

Early career

While not at school or college, Byron lived at his mother's residence, Burgage Manor in Southwell, Nottinghamshire. While there, he cultivated friendships with Elizabeth Bridget Pigot and her brother John, with whom he staged two plays for the entertainment of the community. During this time, with the help of Elizabeth Pigot, who copied many of his rough drafts, he was encouraged to write his first volumes of poetry. Fugitive Pieces was printed by Ridge of Newark, which contained poems written when Byron was only 17. However, it was promptly recalled and burned on the advice of his friend the Reverend J. T. Becher, on account of its more amorous verses, particularly the poem To Mary.

Hours of Idleness, a collection of many of the previous poems, along with more recent compositions, was the culminating book. The savage, anonymous criticism it received (now known to be the work of Henry Peter Brougham) in the Edinburgh Review prompted Byron to compose his first major satire, English Bards and Scotch Reviewers (1809). Byron put it into the hands of his relative R. C. Dallas, and asked him to "...get it published without his name." Alexander Dallas suggested a large number of changes to the manuscript, and provided the reasoning for some of them. Dallas also stated that Byron had originally intended to prefix an argument to this poem, which Dallas quoted. Although it was published anonymously, that April R. C. Dallas wrote that "you are already pretty generally known to be the author". The work so upset some of his critics that they challenged Byron to a duel; over time, in subsequent editions, it became a mark of prestige to be the target of Byron's pen.

After his return from travels he entrusted R. C. Dallas, as his literary agent, with the publication of his poem Childe Harold's Pilgrimage, which Byron thought to be of little account. The first two cantos of Childe Harold's Pilgrimage were published in 1812 and were received with critical acclaim. In Byron’s own words, "I awoke one morning and found myself famous." He followed up this success with the poem's last two cantos, as well as four equally celebrated "Oriental Tales": The Giaour, The Bride of Abydos, The Corsair, and Lara. About the same time, he began his intimacy with his future biographer, Thomas Moore.

First travels to the East

Byron racked up numerous debts as a young man, owing to what his mother termed a "reckless disregard for money". She lived at Newstead during this time, in fear of her son's creditors. He had planned to spend some time in 1808 cruising with his cousin George Bettesworth, who was captain of the 32-gun frigate HMS Tartar, but Bettesworth's death at the Battle of Alvøen in May 1808 made that impossible.

From 1809 to 1811, Byron went on the Grand Tour, then a customary part of the education of young noblemen. He travelled with Hobhouse for the first year, and his entourage of servants included Byron's trustworthy valet, William Fletcher. Hobhouse and Byron often made Fletcher the butt of their humour. The Napoleonic Wars forced Byron to avoid touring in most of Europe; he instead turned to the Mediterranean. His journey enabled him to avoid his creditors and to meet up with a former love, Mary Chaworth (the subject of his poem "To a Lady: On Being Asked My Reason for Quitting England in the Spring"). Letters to Byron from his friend Charles Skinner Matthews reveal that a key motive was also the hope of homosexual experiences. Another reason for choosing to visit the Mediterranean was probably his curiosity about the Levant; he had read about the Ottoman and Persian lands as a child, was attracted to Islam (especially Sufi mysticism), and later wrote, "With these countries, and events connected with them, all my really poetical feelings begin and end."

Byron began his trip in Portugal, from where he wrote a letter to his friend Mr Hodgson in which he describes what he had learned of the Portuguese language: mainly swear words and insults. Byron particularly enjoyed his stay in Sintra, which he later described in Childe Harold's Pilgrimage as "glorious Eden". From Lisbon he travelled overland to Seville, Jerez de la Frontera, Cádiz, and Gibraltar, and from there by sea to Sardinia, Malta, and Greece.

While in Athens, Byron met 14-year-old Nicolo Giraud, with whom he became quite close and who taught him Italian. It has been suggested that the two may have had a sexual affair. Byron arranged to have Giraud enrolled in school at a monastery in Malta, and wrote him into his will, with a bequest of £7,000. (That will, however, was later cancelled.) Byron wrote to Hobhouse from Athens, "I am tired of pl & opt Cs, the last thing I could be tired of." Opt Cs refers to a quote from Petronius' Satyricon, "," "complete intercourse to one's heart's desire," their shared code for homosexual experiences.

In Athens in 1810, Byron wrote "Maid of Athens, ere we part" for a 12-year-old girl, Teresa Makri (1798–1875).

Byron and Hobhouse made their way to Smyrna, where they cadged a ride to Constantinople on HMS Salsette. On 3 May 1810, while Salsette was anchored awaiting Ottoman permission to dock at the city, Byron and Lieutenant Ekenhead, of Salsettes Marines, swam the Hellespont. Byron commemorated this feat in the second canto of Don Juan. He returned to England from Malta in July 1811 aboard .

England 1811–1816

After the publication of the first two cantos of Childe Harold's Pilgrimage (1812), Byron became a celebrity. "He rapidly became the most brilliant star in the dazzling world of Regency London. He was sought after at every society venue, elected to several exclusive clubs, and frequented the most fashionable London drawing-rooms." During this period in England he produced many works, including The Giaour, The Bride of Abydos (1813), Parisina, and The Siege of Corinth (1815). On the initiative of the composer Isaac Nathan, he produced in 1814–1815 the Hebrew Melodies (including what became some of his best-known lyrics, such as "She Walks in Beauty" and "The Destruction of Sennacherib"). Involved at first in an affair with Lady Caroline Lamb (who called him "mad, bad and dangerous to know") and with other lovers and also pressed by debt, he began to seek a suitable marriage, considering – amongst others – Annabella Millbanke. However, in 1813 he met for the first time in four years his half-sister, Augusta Leigh. Rumours of incest surrounded the pair; Augusta's daughter Medora (b. 1814) was suspected to have been Byron's child. To escape from growing debts and rumours, Byron pressed in his determination to marry Annabella, who was said to be the likely heiress of a rich uncle. They married on 2 January 1815, and their daughter, Ada, was born in December of that year. However, Byron's continuing obsession with Augusta Leigh (and his continuing sexual escapades with actresses such as Charlotte Mardyn and others) made their marital life a misery. Annabella considered Byron insane, and in January 1816 she left him, taking their daughter, and began proceedings for a legal separation. Their separation was made legal in a private settlement in March 1816. The scandal of the separation, the rumours about Augusta, and ever-increasing debts forced him to leave England in April 1816, never to return.

Life abroad (1816–1824)

Switzerland and the Shelleys

After this break-up of his domestic life, and by pressure on the part of his creditors, which led to the sale of his library, Byron left England, and never returned. (Despite his dying wishes, however, his body was returned for burial in England.) He journeyed through Belgium and continued up the Rhine river. In the summer of 1816 he settled at the Villa Diodati by Lake Geneva, Switzerland, with his personal physician, John William Polidori. There Byron befriended the poet Percy Bysshe Shelley and Shelley's future wife, Mary Godwin. He was also joined by Mary's stepsister, Claire Clairmont, with whom he'd had an affair in London. Several times Byron went to see Germaine de Staël and her Coppet group, which turned out to be a valid intellectual and emotional support to Byron at the time.

Kept indoors at the Villa Diodati by the "incessant rain" of "that wet, ungenial summer" over three days in June, the five turned to reading fantastical stories, including Fantasmagoriana, and then devising their own tales. Mary Shelley produced what would become Frankenstein, or The Modern Prometheus, and Polidori produced The Vampyre, the progenitor of the Romantic vampire genre. The Vampyre was the inspiration for a fragmentary story of Byron's, "A Fragment".

Byron's story fragment was published as a postscript to Mazeppa; he also wrote the third canto of Childe Harold.

Italy
Byron wintered in Venice, pausing in his travels when he fell in love with Marianna Segati, in whose Venice house he was lodging, and who was soon replaced by 22-year-old Margarita Cogni; both women were married. Cogni could not read or write, and she left her husband to move in with Byron. Their fighting often caused Byron to spend the night in his gondola; when he asked her to leave the house, she threw herself into the Venetian canal.

In 1816, Byron visited San Lazzaro degli Armeni in Venice, where he acquainted himself with Armenian culture with the help of the monks belonging to the Mechitarist Order. With the help of Father Pascal Aucher (Harutiun Avkerian), he learned the Armenian language and attended many seminars about language and history. He co-authored Grammar English and Armenian in 1817, an English textbook written by Aucher and corrected by Byron, and A Grammar Armenian and English in 1819, a project he initiated of a grammar of Classical Armenian for English speakers, where he included quotations from classical and modern Armenian.

Byron later helped to compile the English Armenian Dictionary (Barraran angleren yev hayeren, 1821) and wrote the preface, in which he explained Armenian oppression by the Turkish pashas and the Persian satraps and the Armenian struggle of liberation. His two main translations are the Epistle of Paul to the Corinthians, two chapters of Movses Khorenatsi's History of Armenia, and sections of Nerses of Lambron's Orations.

His fascination was so great that he even considered a replacement of the Cain story of the Bible with that of the legend of the Armenian patriarch Haik. He may be credited with the birth of Armenology and its propagation. His profound lyricism and ideological courage have inspired many Armenian poets, the likes of Ghevond Alishan, Smbat Shahaziz, Hovhannes Tumanyan, Ruben Vorberian, and others.

In 1817, he journeyed to Rome. On returning to Venice, he wrote the fourth canto of Childe Harold. About the same time, he sold Newstead Abby and published Manfred, Cain, and The Deformed Transformed. The first five cantos of Don Juan were written between 1818 and 1820. During this period he met the 18-year-old Countess Guiccioli, who found her first love in Byron; he asked her to elope with him.

Because of his love for the local aristocratic, young, newly married Teresa Guiccioli, Byron lived in Ravenna from 1819 to 1821. Here he continued Don Juan and wrote the Ravenna Diary and My Dictionary and Recollections. Around this time he received visits from Percy Bysshe Shelley, as well as from Thomas Moore, to whom he confided his autobiography or "life and adventures", which Moore, Hobhouse, and Byron's publisher, John Murray, burned in 1824, a month after Byron's death. Of Byron's lifestyle in Ravenna we know more from Shelley, who documented some of its more colourful aspects in a letter: "Lord Byron gets up at two. I get up, quite contrary to my usual custom ... at 12. After breakfast we sit talking till six. From six to eight we gallop through the pine forest which divide Ravenna from the sea; we then come home and dine, and sit up gossiping till six in the morning. I don't suppose this will kill me in a week or fortnight, but I shall not try it longer. Lord B.'s establishment consists, besides servants, of ten horses, eight enormous dogs, three monkeys, five cats, an eagle, a crow, and a falcon; and all these, except the horses, walk about the house, which every now and then resounds with their unarbitrated quarrels, as if they were the masters of it... . [P.S.] I find that my enumeration of the animals in this Circean Palace was defective ... . I have just met on the grand staircase five peacocks, two guinea hens, and an Egyptian crane. I wonder who all these animals were before they were changed into these shapes."

In 1821, Byron left Ravenna and went to live in the Tuscan city of Pisa, to which Teresa had also relocated. From 1821 to 1822, Byron finished Cantos 6–12 of Don Juan at Pisa, and in the same year he joined with Leigh Hunt and Shelley in starting a short-lived newspaper, The Liberal, in whose first number The Vision of Judgment appeared. For the first time since his arrival in Italy, Byron found himself tempted to give dinner parties; his guests included the Shelleys, Edward Ellerker Williams, Thomas Medwin, John Taaffe, and Edward John Trelawny; and "never", as Shelley said, "did he display himself to more advantage than on these occasions; being at once polite and cordial, full of social hilarity and the most perfect good humour; never diverging into ungraceful merriment, and yet keeping up the spirit of liveliness throughout the evening."

Shelley and Williams rented a house on the coast and had a schooner built. Byron decided to have his own yacht, and engaged Trelawny's friend, Captain Daniel Roberts, to design and construct the boat. Named the Bolivar, it was later sold to Charles John Gardiner, 1st Earl of Blessington, and Marguerite, Countess of Blessington, when Byron left for Greece in 1823.

Byron attended the beachside cremation of Shelley, which was orchestrated by Trelawny after Williams and Shelley drowned in a boating accident on 8 July 1822. His last Italian home was in Genoa. While living there he was accompanied by the Countess Guiccioli, and the Blessingtons. Lady Blessington based much of the material in her book, Conversations with Lord Byron, on the time spent together there. This book became an important biographical text about Byron's life just prior to his death.

Ottoman Greece

Byron was living in Genoa in 1823, when, growing bored with his life there, he accepted overtures for his support from representatives of the Greek independence movement from the Ottoman Empire. At first, Byron did not wish to leave his 22-year-old mistress, Countess Teresa Guiccioli, who had abandoned her husband to live with him. But ultimately Guiccioli's father, Count Gamba, was allowed to leave his exile in the Romagna under the condition that his daughter return to him, without Byron. At the same time that the philhellene, Edward Blaquiere, was attempting to recruit him, Byron was confused as to what he was supposed to do in Greece, writing: "Blaquiere seemed to think that I might be of some use-even here;—though what he did not exactly specify". With the assistance of his banker and Captain Daniel Roberts, Byron chartered the brig Hercules to take him to Greece. When Byron left Genoa, it caused "passionate grief" from Guiccioli, who wept openly as he sailed away. The Hercules was forced to return to port shortly afterwards. When it set sail for the final time, Guiccioli had already left Genoa. On 16 July, Byron left Genoa, arriving at Kefalonia in the Ionian Islands on 4 August.

His voyage is covered in detail in Donald Prell's Sailing with Byron from Genoa to Cephalonia. Prell also wrote of a coincidence in Byron's chartering the Hercules. The vessel was launched only a few miles south of Seaham Hall, where in 1815 Byron married Annabella Milbanke. Between 1815 and 1823 the vessel was in service between England and Canada. Suddenly in 1823, the ship's Captain decided to sail to Genoa and offer the Hercules for charter. After taking Byron to Greece, the ship returned to England, never again to venture into the Mediterranean. The Hercules was aged 37 when, on 21 September 1852, she went aground near Hartlepool, 25 miles south of Sunderland, the place where her keel had been laid in 1815. Byron's "keel was laid" nine months before his official birth date, 22 January 1788. Therefore in ship years, he was also 37 when he died in Missolonghi.

Byron initially stayed on the island of Kefalonia, where he was besieged by agents of the rival Greek factions, all of whom wanted to recruit Byron for their own cause. The Ionian islands, of which Kefalonia is one, were under British rule until 1864. Byron spent £4,000 of his own money to refit the Greek fleet. When Byron travelled to the mainland of Greece on the night of 28 December 1823, Byron's ship was surprised by an Ottoman warship, which did not attack his ship, as the Ottoman captain mistook Byron's boat for a fireship. To avoid the Ottoman Navy, which he encountered several times on his voyage, Byron was forced to take a roundabout route and only reached Missolonghi on 5 January 1824.

After arriving in Missolonghi, Byron joined forces with Alexandros Mavrokordatos, a Greek politician with military power. Byron moved to the second floor of a two-story house and was forced to spend much of his time dealing with unruly Souliotes who demanded that Byron pay them the back-pay owed to them by the Greek government. Byron gave the Souliotes some £6,000. Byron was supposed to lead an attack on the Ottoman fortress of Navpaktos, whose Albanian garrison were unhappy due to arrears in pay, and who offered to put up only token resistance if Byron was willing to bribe them into surrendering. However, Ottoman commander Yussuf Pasha executed the mutinous Albanian officers who were offering to surrender Navpaktos to Byron and arranged to have some of the arrears paid out to the rest of the garrison. Byron never led the attack on Navpaktos because the Souliotes kept demanding that Byron pay them more and more money before they would march; Byron grew tired of their blackmail and sent them all home on 15 February 1824. Byron wrote in a note to himself: "Having tried in vain at every expense, considerable trouble—and some danger to unite the Suliotes for the good of Greece-and their own—I have come to the following resolution—I will have nothing more to do with the Suliotes-they may go to the Turks or the devil...they may cut me into more pieces than they have dissensions among them, sooner than change my resolution". At the same time, Guiccioli's brother, Pietro Gamba, who had followed Byron to Greece, exasperated Byron with his incompetence as he continually made expensive mistakes. For example, when asked to buy some cloth from Corfu, Gamba ordered the wrong cloth in excess, causing the bill to be 10 times higher than what Byron wanted. Byron wrote about his right-hand man: "Gamba—who is anything but lucky—had something to do with it—and as usual—the moment he had—matters went wrong".

To help raise money for the revolution, Byron sold his estate in England, Rochdale Manor, which raised some £11,250. This led Byron to estimate that he now had some £20,000 at his disposal, all of which he planned to spend on the Greek cause. In today's money Byron would have been a millionaire many times over. News that a fabulously wealthy British aristocrat, known for his financial generosity, had arrived in Greece made Byron the object of much solicitation in that desperately poor country. Byron wrote to his business agent in England, "I should not like to give the Greeks but a half helping hand", saying he would have wanted to spend his entire fortune on Greek freedom. Byron found himself besieged by various people, both Greek and foreign, who tried to persuade him to open his pocketbook for support. By the end of March 1824, the so-called "Byron brigade" of 30 philhellene officers and about 200 men had been formed, paid for entirely by Byron. Leadership of the Greek cause in the Roumeli region was divided between two rival leaders: a former Klepht (bandit), Odysseas Androutsos; and a wealthy Phanariot Prince, Alexandros Mavrokordatos. Byron used his prestige to attempt to persuade the two rival leaders to come together to focus on defeating the Ottomans. At the same time, other leaders of the Greek factions like Petrobey Mavromichalis and Theodoros Kolokotronis wrote letters to Byron telling him to disregard all of the Roumeliot leaders and to come to their respective areas in the Peloponnese. This drove Byron to distraction; he complained that the Greeks were hopelessly disunited and spent more time feuding with each other than trying to win independence. Byron's friend Edward John Trelawny had aligned himself with Androutsos, who ruled Athens, and was now pressing for Byron to break with Mavrokordatos in favour of backing the rival Androutsos. Androutsos, having won over Trelawny to his cause, was now anxious to persuade Byron to put his wealth behind his claim to be the leader of Greece. Byron wrote with disgust about how one of the Greek captains, former Klepht Georgios Karaiskakis, attacked Missolonghi on 3 April 1824 with some 150 men supported by the Souliotes as he was unhappy with Mavrokordatos's leadership, which led to a brief bout of inter-Greek fighting before Karaiskakis was chased away by April 6.

Byron adopted a nine-year-old Turkish Muslim girl called Hato, whose parents had been killed by the Greeks. He ultimately sent her to safety in Kefalonia, knowing well that religious hatred between the Orthodox Greeks and Muslim Turks was running high and that any Muslim in Greece, even a child, was in serious danger. Until 1934, most Turks did not have surnames; Hato's lack of a surname was quite typical for a Turkish family at this time.

Byron pursued his Greek page, Lukas Chalandritsanos, with whom he had fallen madly in love, but the affections went unrequited. Byron spoiled the teenage Chalandritsanos outrageously, spending some £600 (the equivalent of about £24,600 in today's money) catering to his every whim over the course of 6 months and writing his last poems about his passion for the Greek boy. Chalandritsanos was only interested in Byron's money. When the famous Danish sculptor Bertel Thorvaldsen heard about Byron's heroics in Greece, he voluntarily resculpted his earlier bust of Byron in Greek marble.

Death

Mavrokordatos and Byron planned to attack the Turkish-held fortress of Lepanto, at the mouth of the Gulf of Corinth. Byron employed a fire master to prepare artillery, and he took part of the rebel army under his own command despite his lack of military experience. Before the expedition could sail, on February 15, 1824, he fell ill, and bloodletting weakened him further. He made a partial recovery, but in early April he caught a violent cold; the therapeutic bleeding insisted on by his doctors exacerbated it. He contracted a violent fever and died in Missolonghi on 19 April.

His physician at the time, Julius van Millingen, son of Dutch–English archaeologist James Millingen, was unable to prevent his death. It has been said that if Byron had lived and had gone on to defeat the Ottomans, he might have been declared King of Greece. However, modern scholars have found such an outcome unlikely. The British historian David Brewer wrote that in one sense, Byron failed to persuade the rival Greek factions to unite, won no victories and was successful only in the humanitarian sphere, using his great wealth to help the victims of the war, Christian and Muslim, but this did not affect the outcome of the Greek war of independence.

Brewer went on to argue,

Post mortem 

Alfred Tennyson would later recall the shocked reaction in Britain when word was received of Byron's death. The Greeks mourned Lord Byron deeply, and he became a hero. The national poet of Greece, Dionysios Solomos, wrote a poem about the unexpected loss, named To the Death of Lord Byron. Βύρων, the Greek form of "Byron", continues in popularity as a masculine name in Greece, and a suburb of Athens is called Vyronas in his honour.

Byron's body was embalmed, but the Greeks wanted some part of their hero to stay with them. According to some sources, his heart remained at Missolonghi. His other remains were sent to England (accompanied by his faithful manservant, "Tita") for burial in Westminster Abbey, but the Abbey refused for reason of "questionable morality". Huge crowds viewed his coffin as he lay in state for two days at number 25 Great George Street, Westminster. He is buried at the Church of St. Mary Magdalene in Hucknall, Nottinghamshire. A marble slab given by the King of Greece is laid directly above Byron's grave. His daughter Ada Lovelace was later buried beside him.

Byron's friends raised £1,000 to commission a statue of the writer; Thorvaldsen offered to sculpt it for that amount. However, after the statue was completed in 1834, for ten years, British institutions turned it down and it remained in storage. It was refused by the British Museum, St. Paul's Cathedral, Westminster Abbey and the National Gallery before Trinity College, Cambridge finally placed the statue of Byron in its library.

In 1969, 145 years after Byron's death, a memorial to him was finally placed in Westminster Abbey. The memorial had been lobbied for since 1907: The New York Times wrote, "People are beginning to ask whether this ignoring of Byron is not a thing of which England should be ashamed ... a bust or a tablet might be put in the Poets' Corner and England be relieved of ingratitude toward one of her really great sons."

Robert Ripley had drawn a picture of Boatswain's grave with the caption "Lord Byron's dog has a magnificent tomb while Lord Byron himself has none". This came as a shock to the English, particularly schoolchildren, who, Ripley said, raised funds of their own accord to provide the poet with a suitable memorial.

Close to the centre of Athens, Greece, outside the National Garden, is a statue depicting Greece in the form of a woman crowning Byron. The statue is by the French sculptors Henri-Michel Chapu and Alexandre Falguière. Since 2008, the anniversary of Byron's death, 19 April, has been honoured in Greece as "Byron Day".

Upon his death, the barony passed to Byron's cousin George Anson Byron, a career naval officer.

Personal life

Relationships and scandals

Byron described his first intense feelings at the age of seven for his distant cousin Mary Duff:

Byron also became attached to Margaret Parker, another distant cousin. While his recollection of his love for Mary Duff is that he was ignorant of adult sexuality during this time and was bewildered as to the source of the intensity of his feelings, he would later confess that:

 This is the only reference Byron himself makes to the event, and he is ambiguous as to how old he was when it occurred. After his death, his lawyer wrote to a mutual friend telling him a "singular fact" about Byron's life which was "scarcely fit for narration". But he disclosed it nonetheless, thinking it might explain Byron's sexual "propensities":

 Gray later used this knowledge as a means of ensuring his silence if he were to be tempted to disclose the "low company" she kept during drinking binges. She was later dismissed, supposedly for beating Byron when he was 11.

A few years later, while he was still a child, Lord Grey De Ruthyn (unrelated to May Gray), a suitor of his mother's, also made sexual advances on him. Byron's personality has been characterised as exceptionally proud and sensitive, especially when it came to his deformity. His extreme reaction to seeing his mother flirting outrageously with Lord Grey De Ruthyn after the incident suggests he did not tell her of Grey's conduct toward him; he simply refused to speak to him again and ignored his mother's commands to be reconciled. Leslie A. Marchand, one of Byron's biographers, theorises that Lord Grey De Ruthyn's advances prompted Byron's later sexual liaisons with young men at Harrow and Cambridge.

Scholars acknowledge a more or less important bisexual component in Byron's very complex sentimental and sexual life. Bernhard Jackson asserts that "Byron's sexual orientation has long been a difficult, not to say contentious, topic, and anyone who seeks to discuss it must to some degree speculate since the evidence is nebulous, contradictory and scanty... it is not so simple to define Byron as homosexual or heterosexual: he seems rather to have been both, and either." Crompton states: "What was not understood in Byron's own century (except by a tiny circle of his associates) was that Byron was bisexual". Another biographer, Fiona MacCarthy, has posited that Byron's true sexual yearnings were for adolescent males. Byron used a code by which he communicated his homosexual Greek adventures to John Hobhouse in England: Bernhard Jackson recalls that "Byron's early code for sex with a boy" was "Plen(um). and optabil(em). -Coit(um)" Bullough summarises: 

In 1812, Byron embarked on a well-publicised affair with the married Lady Caroline Lamb that shocked the British public. She had spurned the attention of the poet on their first meeting, subsequently giving Byron what became his lasting epitaph when she famously described him as "mad, bad and dangerous to know". This did not prevent her from pursuing him. Byron eventually broke off the relationship and moved swiftly on to others (such as Lady Oxford), but Lamb never entirely recovered, pursuing him even after he tired of her. She was emotionally disturbed and lost so much weight that Byron sarcastically commented to her mother-in-law, his friend Lady Melbourne, that he was "haunted by a skeleton".
She began to stalk him, calling on him at home, sometimes dressed in disguise as a pageboy, at a time when such an act could ruin both of them socially. Once, during such a visit, she wrote on a book at his desk, "Remember me!" As a retort, Byron wrote a poem entitled Remember Thee! Remember Thee! which concludes with the line "Thou false to him, thou fiend to me".

As a child, Byron had seen little of his half-sister Augusta Leigh; in adulthood, he formed a close relationship with her that has been interpreted by some as incestuous, and by others as innocent. Augusta (who was married) gave birth on 15 April 1814 to her third daughter, Elizabeth Medora Leigh, rumoured by some to be Byron's.

Eventually, Byron began to court Lady Caroline's cousin Anne Isabella Milbanke ("Annabella"), who refused his first proposal of marriage but later accepted him. Milbanke was a highly moral woman, intelligent and mathematically gifted; she was also an heiress. They married at Seaham Hall, County Durham, on 2 January 1815. The marriage proved unhappy. They had a daughter, Augusta Ada. On 16 January 1816, Lady Byron left him, taking Ada with her. That same year on 21 April, Byron signed the Deed of Separation. Rumours of marital violence, adultery with actresses, incest with Augusta Leigh, and sodomy were circulated, assisted by a jealous Lady Caroline. In a letter, Augusta quoted him as saying: "Even to have such a thing said is utter destruction and ruin to a man from which he can never recover." That same year Lady Caroline published her popular novel Glenarvon, in which Lord Byron was portrayed as the seedy title character.

Children

Byron wrote a letter to John Hanson from Newstead Abbey, dated 17 January 1809, that includes "You will discharge my Cook, & Laundry Maid, the other two I shall retain to take care of the house, more especially as the youngest is pregnant (I need not tell you by whom) and I cannot have the girl on the parish." His reference to "The youngest" is understood to have been to a maid, Lucy, and the parenthesised remark to indicate himself as siring a son born that year. In 2010 part of a baptismal record was uncovered which apparently said: "September 24 George illegitimate son of Lucy Monk, illegitimate son of Baron Byron, of Newstead, Nottingham, Newstead Abbey."

Augusta Leigh's child, Elizabeth Medora Leigh, born in 1814, was possibly fathered by Byron, who was Augusta's half-brother.

Byron had a child, The Hon. Augusta Ada Byron ("Ada", later Countess of Lovelace), in 1815, by his wife Annabella Byron, Lady Byron (née Anne Isabella Milbanke, or "Annabella"), later Lady Wentworth. Ada Lovelace, notable in her own right, collaborated with Charles Babbage on the analytical engine, a predecessor to modern computers. She is recognised as one of the world's first computer programmers.

He also had an extramarital child in 1817, Clara Allegra Byron, with Claire Clairmont, stepsister of Mary Shelley and stepdaughter of William Godwin, writer of Political Justice and Caleb Williams. Allegra is not entitled to the style "The Hon." as is usually given to the daughter of barons, since she was born outside of his marriage. Born in Bath in 1817, Allegra lived with Byron for a few months in Venice; he refused to allow an Englishwoman caring for the girl to adopt her and objected to her being raised in the Shelleys' household. He wished for her to be brought up Catholic and not marry an Englishman, and he made arrangements for her to inherit 5,000 lire upon marriage or when she reached the age of 21, provided she did not marry a native of Britain. However, the girl died aged five of a fever in Bagnacavallo, Italy, while Byron was in Pisa; he was deeply upset by the news. He had Allegra's body sent back to England to be buried at his old school, Harrow, because Protestants could not be buried in consecrated ground in Catholic countries. At one time he himself had wanted to be buried at Harrow. Byron was antagonistic towards Allegra's mother, Claire Clairmont, and prevented her from seeing the child.

Scotland

Although neglected by traditional historiography, Byron had a complex identity and strong ties to Scotland. His maternal family, the Gordons, had its roots in Aberdeenshire and Byron was educated at Aberdeen Grammar School between 1794 and 1798. In terms of his own identity, he described himself as "half a Scot by birth, and bred/A whole one" and he reportedly spoke with a faint Scottish accent throughout his life. Byron was regarded as a Scot by a number of his contemporaries, including his lover Lady Caroline Lamb and by his first biographer Sir Cosmo Gordon, who described him as a "Highlander".
 
Byron's links to Scotland were demonstrated "in his campaign for the liberation of Greece, where a disproportionate number of his closest friends and associates had strong Scottish connexions, particularly with regard to north-eastern Scotland, which through his Gordon links remained central to the Byronic network throughout his life".

Sea and swimming
Byron enjoyed adventure, especially relating to the sea.

The first recorded notable example of open water swimming took place on 3 May 1810 when Lord Byron swam from Europe to Asia across the Hellespont Strait. This is often seen as the birth of the sport and pastime, and to commemorate it, the event is recreated every year as an open water swimming event.

Whilst sailing from Genoa to Cephalonia in 1823, every day at noon, Byron and Trelawny, in calm weather, jumped overboard for a swim without fear of sharks, which were not unknown in those waters. Once, according to Trelawny, they let the geese and ducks loose and followed them and the dogs into the water, each with an arm in the ship Captain's new scarlet waistcoat, to the annoyance of the Captain and the amusement of the crew.

Fondness for animals

Byron had a great love of animals, most notably for a Newfoundland dog named Boatswain. When the animal contracted rabies, Byron nursed him, albeit unsuccessfully, without any thought or fear of becoming bitten and infected.

Although deeply in debt at the time, Byron commissioned an impressive marble funerary monument for Boatswain at Newstead Abbey, larger than his own, and the only building work that he ever carried out on his estate. In his 1811 will, Byron requested that he be buried with him. The 26‐line poem "Epitaph to a Dog" has become one of his best-known works. But a draft of an 1830 letter by Hobhouse shows him to be the author; Byron decided to use Hobhouse's lengthy epitaph instead of his own, which read: "To mark a friend's remains these stones arise/I never knew but one – and here he lies."

Byron also kept a tame bear while he was a student at Trinity out of resentment for rules forbidding pet dogs like his beloved Boatswain. There being no mention of bears in their statutes, the college authorities had no legal basis for complaining; Byron even suggested that he would apply for a college fellowship for the bear.

During his lifetime, in addition to numerous cats, dogs, and horses, Byron kept a fox, monkeys, an eagle, a crow, a falcon, peacocks, guinea hens, an Egyptian crane, a badger, geese, a heron, and a goat. Except for the horses, they all resided indoors at his homes in England, Switzerland, Italy, and Greece. Percy Shelley, visiting Byron in Italy in 1821, described his menagerie:

Health and appearance

Character and psyche

As a boy, Byron's character is described as a "mixture of affectionate sweetness and playfulness, by which it was impossible not to be attached", although he also exhibited "silent rages, moody sullenness and revenge" with a precocious bent for attachment and obsession.

Deformed foot
From birth, Byron had a deformity of his right foot. Although it has generally been referred to as a "club foot", some modern medical authors maintain that it was a consequence of infantile paralysis (poliomyelitis), and others that it was a dysplasia, a failure of the bones to form properly. Whatever the cause, he was affected by a limp that caused him lifelong psychological and physical misery, aggravated by painful and pointless "medical treatment" in his childhood and the nagging suspicion that with proper care it might have been cured.

He was extremely self-conscious about this from a young age, nicknaming himself  (French for "the limping devil", after the nickname given to Asmodeus by Alain-René Lesage in his 1707 novel of the same name). Although he often wore specially-made shoes in an attempt to hide the deformed foot, he refused to wear any type of brace that might improve the limp.

Scottish novelist John Galt felt his oversensitivity to the "innocent fault in his foot was unmanly and excessive" because the limp was "not greatly conspicuous". He first met Byron on a voyage to Sardinia and did not realise he had any deficiency for several days, and still could not tell at first if the lameness was a temporary injury or not. At the time Galt met him he was an adult and had worked to develop "a mode of walking across a room by which it was scarcely at all perceptible". The motion of the ship at sea may also have helped to create a favourable first impression and hide any deficiencies in his gait, but Galt's biography is also described as being "rather well-meant than well-written", so Galt may be guilty of minimising a defect that was actually still noticeable.

Physical appearance

He was renowned for his personal beauty, which he enhanced by wearing curl-papers in his hair at night. He was athletic, being a competent boxer and horse-rider and an excellent swimmer. He attended pugilistic tuition at the Bond Street rooms of former prizefighting champion 'Gentleman' John Jackson, whom Byron called 'the Emperor of Pugilism', and recorded these sparring sessions in his letters and journals.

Byron and other writers, such as his friend Hobhouse, described his eating habits in detail. At the time he entered Cambridge, he went on a strict diet to control his weight. He also exercised a great deal, and at that time wore a great many clothes to cause himself to perspire. For most of his life, he was a vegetarian and often lived for days on dry biscuits and white wine. Occasionally he would eat large helpings of meat and desserts, after which he would purge himself. Although he is described by Galt and others as having a predilection for "violent" exercise, Hobhouse suggests that the pain in his deformed foot made physical activity difficult and that his weight problem was the result.

Trelawny, who observed Byron's eating habits, noted that he lived on a diet of biscuits and soda water for days at a time and then would eat a "horrid mess of cold potatoes, rice, fish, or greens, deluged in vinegar, and gobble it up like a famished dog".

Political career
Byron first took his seat in the House of Lords on 13 March 1809 but left London on 11 June 1809 for the Continent. Byron's association with the Holland House Whigs provided him with a discourse of liberty rooted in the Glorious Revolution of 1688. A strong advocate of social reform, he received particular praise as one of the few Parliamentary defenders of the Luddites: specifically, he was against a death penalty for Luddite "frame breakers" in Nottinghamshire, who destroyed textile machines that were putting them out of work. His first speech before the Lords, on 27 February 1812, was loaded with sarcastic references to the "benefits" of automation, which he saw as producing inferior material as well as putting people out of work, and concluded the proposed law was only missing two things to be effective: "Twelve Butchers for a Jury and a Jeffries for a Judge!". Byron's speech was officially recorded and printed in Hansard. He said later that he "spoke very violent sentences with a sort of modest impudence" and thought he came across as "a bit theatrical". The full text of the speech, which he had previously written out, was presented to Dallas in manuscript form and he quotes it in his work.

Two months later, in conjunction with the other Whigs, Byron made another impassioned speech before the House of Lords in support of Catholic emancipation. Byron expressed opposition to the established religion because it was unfair to people of other faiths.

These experiences inspired Byron to write political poems such as Song for the Luddites (1816) and The Landlords' Interest, Canto XIV of The Age of Bronze.
Examples of poems in which he attacked his political opponents include Wellington: The Best of the Cut-Throats (1819) and The Intellectual Eunuch Castlereagh (1818).

Poetic works
Byron wrote prolifically. In 1832 his publisher, John Murray, released the complete works in 14 duodecimo volumes, including a life by Thomas Moore. Subsequent editions were released in 17 volumes, first published a year later, in 1833. An extensive collection of his works, including early editions and annotated manuscripts, is held within the John Murray Archive at the National Library of Scotland in Edinburgh.

Don Juan

Byron's magnum opus, Don Juan, a poem spanning 17 cantos, ranks as one of the most important long poems published in England since John Milton's Paradise Lost. Byron published the first two cantos anonymously in 1819 after disputes with his regular publisher over the shocking nature of the poetry. By this time, he had been a famous poet for seven years, and when he self-published the beginning cantos, they were well received in some quarters. The poem was then released volume by volume through his regular publishing house. By 1822, cautious acceptance by the public had turned to outrage, and Byron's publisher refused to continue to publish the work. In Canto III of Don Juan, Byron expresses his detestation for poets such as William Wordsworth and Samuel Taylor Coleridge. In letters to Francis Hodgson, Byron referred to Wordsworth as "Turdsworth".

Irish Avatar

Byron wrote the satirical pamphlet Irish Avatar after the royal visit by King George IV to Ireland. Byron criticised the attitudes displayed by the Irish people towards the Crown, an institution he perceived as oppressing them, and was dismayed by the positive reception George IV received during his visit. In the pamphlet, Byron lambasted Irish unionists and voiced muted support towards nationalistic sentiments in Ireland.

Parthenon marbles

Byron was a bitter opponent of Lord Elgin's removal of the Parthenon marbles from Athens and "reacted with fury" when Elgin's agent gave him a tour of the Parthenon, during which he saw the spaces left by the missing friezes and metopes. He denounced Elgin's actions in his poem The Curse of Minerva and in Canto II (stanzas XI–XV) of Childe Harold's Pilgrimage.

Legacy and influence

Byron's image as the personification of the Byronic hero fascinated the public, and his wife Annabella coined the term "Byromania" to refer to the commotion surrounding him. His self-awareness and personal promotion are seen as a beginning of what would become the modern rock star; he would instruct artists painting portraits of him not to paint him with pen or book in hand, but as a "man of action." While Byron first welcomed fame, he later turned from it by going into voluntary exile from Britain.

Biographies were distorted by the burning of Byron's memoir in the offices of his publisher, John Murray, a month after his death and the suppression of details of Byron's bisexuality by subsequent heads of the firm (which held the richest Byron archive). As late as the 1950s, scholar Leslie Marchand was expressly forbidden by the Murray company to reveal details of Byron's same-sex passions.

The re-founding of the Byron Society in 1971 reflected the fascination that many people had with Byron and his work. This society became very active, publishing an annual journal. Thirty-six Byron Societies function throughout the world, and an International Conference takes place annually.

Byron exercised a marked influence on Continental literature and art, and his reputation as a poet is higher in many European countries than in Britain, or America, although not as high as in his time, when he was widely thought to be the greatest poet in the world. Byron's writings also inspired many composers. Over forty operas have been based on his works, in addition to three operas about Byron himself (including Virgil Thomson's Lord Byron). His poetry was set to music by many Romantic composers, including Beethoven, Schubert, Rossini, Mendelssohn, Schumann and Carl Loewe. Among his greatest admirers was Hector Berlioz, whose operas and Mémoires reveal Byron's influence. In the twentieth century, Arnold Schoenberg set Byron's "Ode to Napoleon" to music.

In April 2020, Byron was featured in a series of UK postage stamps issued by the Royal Mail to commemorate the Romantic poets on the 250th anniversary of the birth of William Wordsworth. Ten 1st class stamps were issued of all the major British romantic poets, and each stamp included an extract from one of their most popular and enduring works, with Byron's "She Walks in Beauty" selected for the poet.

Byronic hero
The figure of the Byronic hero pervades much of his work, and Byron himself is considered to epitomise many of the characteristics of this literary figure. The use of a Byronic hero by many authors and artists of the Romantic movement show Byron's influence during the 19th century and beyond, including the Brontë sisters. His philosophy was more durably influential in continental Europe than in England; Friedrich Nietzsche admired him, and the Byronic hero was echoed in Nietzsche's Übermensch, or superman.

The Byronic hero presents an idealised, but flawed character whose attributes include: great talent; great passion; a distaste for society and social institutions; a lack of respect for rank and privilege (although possessing both); being thwarted in love by social constraint or death; rebellion; exile; an unsavoury secret past; arrogance; overconfidence or lack of foresight; and, ultimately, a self-destructive manner. These types of characters have since become ubiquitous in literature and politics.

In popular culture

Bibliography

Index of Titles
Index of First Lines

Major works

 Hours of Idleness (1807)
 Lachin y Gair (1807)
 English Bards and Scotch Reviewers (1809)
 Childe Harold's Pilgrimage, Cantos I & II (1812)
 The Giaour (1813) (text on Wikisource)
 The Bride of Abydos (1813)
 The Corsair (1814) (text on Wikisource)
 Lara, A Tale (1814) (text on Wikisource)
 Hebrew Melodies (1815)
 The Siege of Corinth (1816) (text on Wikisource)
 Parisina (1816) (text on Wikisource)
 The Prisoner of Chillon (1816) (text on Wikisource)
 The Dream (1816) (text on Wikisource)
 Prometheus (1816) (text on Wikisource)
 Darkness (1816) (text on Wikisource)
 Manfred (1817) (text on Wikisource)
 The Lament of Tasso (1817)
 Beppo (1818) (text on Wikisource)
 Childe Harold's Pilgrimage (1818) (text on Wikisource)
 Don Juan (1819–1824; incomplete on Byron's death in 1824) (text on Wikisource)
 Mazeppa (1819)
 The Prophecy of Dante (1819)
 Marino Faliero (1820)
 Sardanapalus (1821)
 The Two Foscari (1821)
 Cain (1821)
 The Vision of Judgment (1821)
 Heaven and Earth (1821)
 Werner (1822)
 The Age of Bronze (1823)
 The Island (1823) (text on Wikisource)
 The Deformed Transformed (1824)
 Letters and journals, vol. 1 (1830)
 Letters and journals, vol. 2 (1830)

Selected shorter lyric poems

 Maid of Athens, ere we part (1810) (text on Wikisource)
 And thou art dead (1812) (text on Wikisource)
 She Walks in Beauty (1814) (text on Wikisource)
 My Soul is Dark (1815) (text on Wikisource)
 The Destruction of Sennacherib (1815) (text on Wikisource)
 Monody on the Death of the Right Hon. R. B. Sheridan (1816) (text on Wikisource)
 Fare Thee Well (1816) (text on Wikisource)
 So, we'll go no more a roving (1817) (text on Wikisource)
 When We Two Parted (1817) (text on Wikisource)
 Ode on Venice (1819) (text on Wikisource)
 Stanzas (1819)
 Don Leon (not by Lord Byron, but attributed to him; 1830s)

See also

 Early life of Lord Byron
 Timeline of Lord Byron
 19th century in poetry
 Bridge of Sighs, a Venice landmark Byron denominated
 Asteroid 3306 Byron

References

Bibliography

 (Chapter one online at The New York Times)

 Volume 1 of Poetic drama & poetic theory in "Salzburg studies in English literature"

Attribution

Further reading
 Accardo, Peter X. Let Satire Be My Song: Byron's English Bards and Scotch Reviewers. Web exhibit, Houghton Library, Harvard University, 2011.

 Calder, Angus (1984), Byron and Scotland, in Hearn, Sheila G. (ed.), Cencrastus No. 15, New Year 1984, pp. 21 – 24, 
 Calder, Angus (ed.) (1989), Byron and Scotland: Radical or Dandy?, Edinburgh University Press,  
 Drucker, Peter. 'Byron and Ottoman love: Orientalism, Europeanization and same sex sexualities in the early nineteenth-century Levant' (Journal of European Studies vol. 42 no. 2, June 2012, 140–57).
 Garrett, Martin: George Gordon, Lord Byron. (British Library Writers' Lives). London: British Library, 2000. .
 Garrett, Martin. Palgrave Literary Dictionary of Byron. Palgrave, 2010. .
 Guiccioli, Teresa, contessa di, Lord Byron's Life in Italy, transl. Michael Rees, ed. Peter Cochran, 2005, .
 Grosskurth, Phyllis: Byron: The Flawed Angel. Hodder, 1997. .
 Marchand, Leslie A., editor, Byron's Letters and Journals, Harvard University Press:
 Volume I, 'In my hot youth', 1798–1810, (1973)
 Volume II, 'Famous in my time', 1810–1812, (1973)
 Volume III, 'Alas! the love of women', 1813–1814, (1974)
 Volume IV, 'Wedlock's the devil', 1814–1815, (1975)
 Volume V, 'So late into the night', 1816–1817, (1976)
 Volume VI, 'The flesh is frail', 1818–1819, (1976)
 Volume VII, 'Between two worlds', 1820, (1978)
 Volume VIII, 'Born for opposition', 1821, (1978)
 Volume IX, 'In the wind's eye', 1821–1822, (1978)
 Volume X, 'A heart for every fate', 1822–1823, (1980)
 Volume XI, 'For freedom's battle', 1823–1824, (1981)
 Volume XII, 'The trouble of an index', index, (1982)
 Lord Byron: Selected Letters and Journals, (1982)
 McGann, Jerome: Byron and Romanticism. Cambridge: Cambridge University Press, 2002. .
 Oueijan, Naji B. A Compendium of Eastern Elements in Byron's Oriental Tales. New York: Peter Lang Publishing, 1999.
 Patanè, Vincenzo: L'estate di un ghiro. Il mito di Lord Byron attraverso la vita, i viaggi, gli amori e le opere. Venezia, Cicero, 2013. .
 Patanè, Vincenzo: I frutti acerbi. Lord Byron, gli amori & il sesso. Venezia, Cicero, 2016. .
 Patanè, Vincenzo: The Sour Fruit. Lord Byron, Love & Sex. Lanham (MD), Rowman & Littlefield, copublished by John Cabot University Press, Rome, 2019. .
 Rosen, Fred: Bentham, Byron and Greece. Clarendon Press, Oxford, 1992. .

External links

 
 
 
 Poems by Lord Byron at PoetryFoundation.org
 The Byron Society
 The International Byron Society
 The Messolonghi Byron Society
 George Gordon Byron Collection at the Harry Ransom Center
 George Gordon Byron Collection at the New York Public Library
 George Gordon Byron Collection at the University of Leeds
 George Gordon Byron material at Drew University
 Byron Study Center at the University of Nottingham
 The Byron Chronology
 Byron's 1816–1824 letters to Murray and Moore about Armenian studies and translations
 Biography at the British Library
 The Life and Work of Lord Byron at EnglishHistory.net
 Statue of Byron at Trinity College, Cambridge
 Pictures of Byron's Walk, Seaham, County Durham

 
1788 births
1824 deaths
18th-century English nobility
19th-century British dramatists and playwrights
19th-century British poets
19th-century English nobility
19th-century English poets
19th-century British LGBT people
San Lazzaro degli Armeni alumni
Alumni of Trinity College, Cambridge
Anglo-Scots
Anti-monarchists
Armenian studies scholars
Byron, George Gordon Byron, 6th Baron
Bisexual men
British bisexual writers
British people of Cornish descent
British philhellenes in the Greek War of Independence
Greek people of English descent
Naturalized citizens of Greece
Burials at the Church of St Mary Magdalene, Hucknall
Burials in Nottinghamshire
Byron family
Carbonari
Coppet group
Deaths from sepsis
Deaths from typhoid fever
English dramatists and playwrights
English expatriates in Italy
English male dramatists and playwrights
English male poets
English people of Scottish descent
English people with disabilities
Epic poets
Fellows of the Royal Society
Godwin family
House of Gordon
Left-wing politics in the United Kingdom
LGBT peers
English LGBT poets
English LGBT politicians
Liberalism in the United Kingdom
Literary peers
Missolonghi
People associated with Aberdeen
People educated at Aberdeen Grammar School
People educated at Harrow School
Regency era
Romantic poets
Writers from London
Writers with disabilities
Academics with disabilities